Schrankia balneorum is a species of moth of the family Erebidae first described by Sergei Alphéraky in 1880. It is found in the Caucasus, Crimea, the southern Urals, Turkey, Georgia, Armenia, Azerbaijan and the Kopet Dagh.

References

Moths described in 1880
Hypenodinae